Isobel Jane "Isy" Suttie (born 11 August 1978) is a British musical comedian, actress, and writer. She played Dobby in the British sitcom Peep Show, and in 2013 won the gold Sony Radio Academy Award for her radio show Pearl And Dave. She also provides narration on the UK television show, Posh Pawn.

Early life
Suttie was born in Hull to an English mother and Scottish father, and brought up in Matlock, Derbyshire. Her mother is Jewish.

From an early age, she expressed a desire to act and write. She began playing the guitar and writing songs at the age of twelve after she was refused saxophone lessons. As a teenager she was a member of a progressive rock band called Infinite Drift. She attended Highfields School in Matlock.

Career

Theatre, comedy and music

Suttie trained as an actress at the Guildford School of Acting, graduating in 2000. In 2001 she composed and directed a score for Peter Weiss' play Marat/Sade at the Arcola Theatre in London. Suttie began performing stand-up comedy in 2003. Her act normally consists of music, stand-up and stories, either as herself or under the guise of a character.

At the 2005 Edinburgh Fringe, Suttie was one of the acts in stand-up showcase The Comedy Zone. In 2006, she acted in Danielle Ward's Take-a-Break Tales at The Pleasance with Neil Edmond and Emma Fryer. In 2007, she performed her debut solo stand-up show, Love Lost in the British Retail Industry, which she took to Sydney Arts Festival and on a UK tour in 2010–11, and in 2008 her second solo Edinburgh show The Suttie Show. She played psycho killer Sorrow in the revival of Danielle Ward and Martin White's cult musical Gutted at the Leicester Square Theatre for two performances in February and March 2011. She took her third solo stand-up show, Pearl and Dave, to Edinburgh in August 2011. She appeared at the Just for Laughs Comedy Festival in Montreal in July 2012.

Suttie occasionally duets with folk musician Gavin Osborn and supported musician Jim Bob on tour in 2010. She also appeared with Jim Bob for the fourth year of the Nine Lessons and Carols for Godless People event at the Bloomsbury Theatre in December 2011.

Suttie was nominated for Best Female Newcomer at the 2008 British Comedy Awards, then Female Breakthrough Artist in 2011 and Best Female TV Comic in 2014. She was regional winner of  The Daily Telegraph Young Jazz Competition (1995) for composition, winner of the Julian Slade Songwriting Competition (1998) and Chortle Awards best newcomer nominee (2005). In 2013, the BBC Radio 4 version of Pearl and Dave won a Gold Sony Radio Academy Award.

In February and March 2014, she starred as Phyllis Pearsall, the creator of the A–Z Street Atlas, in the musical The A–Z of Mrs P, which ran at Southwark Playhouse.

Television, radio, film and podcasts

Suttie's first television writing was for two series of the popular teenage drama Skins, under the guise of "comedy consultant".

Suttie appeared in the short film that accompanied the song "God of Loneliness" by Emmy The Great, alongside Shazad Latif, directed by Chris Boyle.

She provides the voices for BBC One's Walk on the Wild Side, in addition to voicing the character of Josie The Dog in Kristen Schaal and Kurt Braunohler's Penelope Princess of Pets (Channel 4 Comedy Lab). She provides voices for children's series The Revolting World of Stanley Brown. Suttie has also provided the voiceover for several TV commercials.

Suttie has previously appeared as a special guest on the popular podcast, Answer Me This!, in April 2013 alongside hosts Helen Zaltzman and Olly Mann.

Suttie played a waitress called Kiki alongside Alan Davies in BBC Two's Whites, which aired in autumn 2010. She has also made TV appearances in Holby City, as Mary Shelley in The Trouble With Love (BBC Two), as various characters in The Incredible Will and Greg (Channel 4), as Lianne in Rab C. Nesbitt (BBC), as a judge in Genie in the House and as a nurse in two episodes of Skins (Channel 4).

She played the regular character Esther Blanco in the last series of Shameless, broadcast in 2013. In January 2013, she appeared in the ITV comedy drama series Great Night Out as Bev.

She was cast as Dobby, IT geek and love interest of David Mitchell's character Mark Corrigan in Peep Show in 2008, a role that she continued to play for the remainder of the show's run until 2015.

Suttie has written and appeared in many shows on BBC radio, including her own BBC Radio 4 series, Isy Suttie's Love Letters, which began in 2013. She is also a regular presenter of The Comedy Club on BBC Radio 4 Extra and has acted in two of Tim Key's radio shows.

She has been on the UK team for the monthly podcast "International Waters", hosted by Jesse Thorn of maximumfun.org. She appeared on episode 2 at the end of March 2012, alongside Dan Antopolski.

In 2012, Suttie voice-acted in the CBeebies show The Cow that Almost Missed Christmas alongside Johnny Vegas. The show was a one-off animation which gave a unique interpretation of the Christmas Nativity seen through the eyes of a cow called Marjorie, who Suttie voiced.

In August 2013, Suttie appeared in the one-off revival episode of the television series Knightmare as Treguard's assistant Veruca/Daisy. The 26-minute episode was aired as part of YouTube's "Geek Week" celebrations.

Suttie appeared in the S4C Welsh learners programme Hwb as a Welsh learner (which she is in real life) in a regular sketch called "Y Wers Gymraeg" ("The Welsh Lesson"), starring her partner Elis James.

In 2014 she wrote and starred in a short film, The Best Night of Roxy's Life, alongside Philip Jackson and JJ Burnel of The Stranglers. The film tells the story of Roxy, a Stranglers superfan who meets JJ, her hero.

In September 2016, she began a six-episode run on the Channel 4 TV show Damned as Natalie, a temporary receptionist. She returned for the second series in 2018.
She also appeared in the sitcom Man Down as Miss Clarke.

Publications
In January 2016, her first book, The Actual One, was published by Orion.
In July 2021, her first novel, Jane Is Trying, was published by Orion.

Personal life
Suttie is engaged to Welsh comedian Elis James. The couple have two children: a daughter, Beti, born in October 2014 and a son, Steffan, born in January 2019. After the birth of her daughter, she developed migraine-associated vertigo.

Filmography

TV

Discography

The A-Z of Mrs P Original London Cast

References

External links
 

1978 births
Living people
21st-century British guitarists
21st-century English musicians
21st-century English women musicians
Actresses from Kingston upon Hull
Alumni of the Guildford School of Acting
British comedy actresses
English rock guitarists
English people of Jewish descent
English people of Scottish descent
English stand-up comedians
English television actresses
English voice actresses
English women comedians
Musicians from Kingston upon Hull
People from Matlock, Derbyshire
Writers from Kingston upon Hull
21st-century English women writers
21st-century English writers
21st-century English comedians
21st-century women guitarists